Robert Solé (born 1946) is a French journalist and novelist of Egyptian origin. Born in Cairo in 1946, Solé moved to France at the age of 18. He has served as ombudsman of the Parisian newspaper Le Monde. His works of fiction include Le Tarbouche (winner of the Prix Mediterranée in 1992) and La Mamelouka.

External links
 Official website
 Profile in Bibliomonde

1946 births
Living people
Journalists from Cairo
20th-century French novelists
21st-century French novelists
Levantine-Egyptians
French male novelists
20th-century French male writers
21st-century French male writers
French male non-fiction writers